Franz Schubert's compositions of uncertain date of composition, that is, composed somewhere between 1810 and 1828, are mostly in the Deutsch catalogue (D) range D 966–992, and include:
 Instrumental works:
 Valses Nobles, D 969
 Vocal music:
 Sketches for an opera known as Sophie, D 982

Table

Legend

List

|-
| 966
| data-sort-value="999.01103" | 11
| data-sort-value="ZZZZ" |

| data-sort-value="ZZZZ" |

| data-sort-value="ZZZZ" |

| data-sort-value="ZZZZ" |

| data-sort-value="ZZZZ" |

| data-sort-value="ZZZZ" |

| See  No. 3
|-
| data-sort-value="999.09662" |
| data-sort-value="966.2" | 966B
| data-sort-value="ZZZZ" |
| data-sort-value="ZZZZ" |
| data-sort-value="506,08" | V, 6 No. 8
| data-sort-value="Orchestral piece, D 966B" | Orchestral piece, D 966B
| data-sort-value="key A major" | A major
| data-sort-value="1820-01-01" | 1820 orlater
| Sketch
|-
| 968
| 968
| data-sort-value="XXX,1888" | (1888)
| data-sort-value="0903,029" | IX, 3No. 29
| data-sort-value="711,07" | VII/1, 1No. 7
| Sonatina, D 968
| data-sort-value="key C major" | C major – A minor
| data-sort-value="1815-01-01" | 1815–1819?
| For piano duet; Allegro moderato – Andante
|-
| 603
| data-sort-value="968.1" | 968A
| data-sort-value="082,1860-2" | 82p,2(1860)
| data-sort-value="0902,018" | IX, 2No. 18
| data-sort-value="711,08" | VII/1, 1No. 8
| Introduction, Variations and Finale
| data-sort-value="key B-flat major" | B major
| data-sort-value="1828-11-19" | ?
| For piano duet
|-
| 886
| data-sort-value="968.2" | 968B
| data-sort-value="121,1829-0" | 121p(1829)
| data-sort-value="0901,006" | IX, 1No. 6
| data-sort-value="714,06" | VII/1, 4
| data-sort-value="Marches caracteristiques, 2" | Deux Marches caractéristiques
| data-sort-value="key C major" | C major
| data-sort-value="1826-03-21" | spring 1826?
| For piano duet
|-
| 969
| 969
| data-sort-value="077,1827-0" | 77(1827)
| data-sort-value="1200,006" | XIINo. 6
| data-sort-value="727,a0" | VII/2, 7a
| data-sort-value="Valses nobles, 12" | 12 Valses nobles
| data-sort-value="key I" | Various keys
| data-sort-value="1827-01-21" | before22/1/1827
| For piano
|-
| 970
| 970
| data-sort-value="XXX,1889" | (1889)
| data-sort-value="1200,013" | XIINo. 13
| data-sort-value="726,00" | VII/2, 6
| data-sort-value="Landler, 06, D 970" | Six Ländler, D 970, a.k.a. German Dances
| data-sort-value="key I" | Various keys
| data-sort-value="1828-11-19" | ?
| For piano; No. 2 near-identical to  No. 7
|-
| 971
| 971
| data-sort-value="XXX,1823" | (1823)
| data-sort-value="1200,014" | XIINo. 14
| data-sort-value="727,a0" | VII/2, 7a
| data-sort-value="German Dances, 03, D 971" | Three German Dances, D 971
| data-sort-value="key I" | Various keys
| data-sort-value="1823-01-09" | before10/1/1823
| For piano
|-
| 972
| 972
| data-sort-value="XXX,1889" | (1889)
| data-sort-value="1200,015" | XIINo. 15
| data-sort-value="726,00" | VII/2, 6
| data-sort-value="German Dances, 03, D 972" | Three German Dances, D 972
| data-sort-value="key I" | Various keys
| data-sort-value="1817-03-01" | beforeApril 1817?
| For piano; No. 3 reused in 
|-
| 973
| 973
| data-sort-value="XXX,1889" | (1889)
| data-sort-value="1200,016" | XIINo. 16
| data-sort-value="726,00" | VII/2, 6
| data-sort-value="German Dances, 03, D 973" | Three German Dances, D 973
| data-sort-value="key I" | Various keys
| data-sort-value="1828-11-19" | ?
| For piano
|-
| 974
| 974
| data-sort-value="XXX,1889" | (1889)
| data-sort-value="1200,017" | XIINo. 17
| data-sort-value="726,00" | VII/2, 6
| data-sort-value="German Dances, 02, D 974" | Two German Dances, D 974
| data-sort-value="key I" | Various keys
| data-sort-value="1828-11-19" | ?
| For piano
|-
| 975
| 975
| data-sort-value="XXX,1889" | (1889)
| data-sort-value="1200,020" | XIINo. 20
| data-sort-value="726,00" | VII/2, 6
| German Dance, D 975
| data-sort-value="key D major" | D major
| data-sort-value="1828-11-19" | ?
| For piano
|-
| 976
| 976
| data-sort-value="XXX,1825" | (1825)
| data-sort-value="1200,022" | XIINo. 22
| data-sort-value="727,a0" | VII/2, 7a
| Cotillon
| data-sort-value="key E-flat major" | E major
| data-sort-value="1825-12-28" | before29/12/1825
| For piano
|-
| 977
| 977
| data-sort-value="XXX,1889" | (1889)
| data-sort-value="1200,026" | XIINo. 26
| data-sort-value="726,00" | VII/2, 6
| data-sort-value="Ecossaises, 08, D 977" | Eight Écossaises, D 977
| data-sort-value="key I" | Various keys
| data-sort-value="1828-11-19" | ?
| For piano
|-
| 978
| 978
| data-sort-value="XXX,1825" | (1825)
| data-sort-value="ZZZZ" |
| data-sort-value="727,a0" | VII/2, 7a
| Waltz, D 978
| data-sort-value="key A-flat major" | A major
| data-sort-value="1825-12-28" | before29/12/1825
| For piano
|-
| 979
| 979
| data-sort-value="XXX,1826" | (1826)
| data-sort-value="ZZZZ" |
| data-sort-value="727,a0" | VII/2, 7a
| Waltz, D 979
| data-sort-value="key G major" | G major
| data-sort-value="1826-12-22" | before23/12/1826
| For piano
|-
| 980
| 980
| data-sort-value="XXX,1826" | (1826)
| data-sort-value="ZZZZ" |
| data-sort-value="727,a0" | VII/2, 7a
| data-sort-value="Waltzes, 02, D 980" | Two Waltzes, D 980
| data-sort-value="key I" | Various keys
| data-sort-value="1826-12-22" | before23/12/1826
| For piano
|-
| 640
| data-sort-value="980.1" | 980A
| data-sort-value="ZZZZ" |
| data-sort-value="ZZZZ" |
| data-sort-value="726,00" | VII/2, 6
| data-sort-value="Dances, 02, D 980A" | Two Dances, D 980A
| data-sort-value="key I" | Various keys
| data-sort-value="1828-11-19" | ?
| For piano; Sketches
|-
| 679
| data-sort-value="980.2" | 980B
| data-sort-value="XXX,1925" | (1925)
| data-sort-value="ZZZZ" |
| data-sort-value="726,00" | VII/2, 6
| data-sort-value="Landler, 02, D 980B" | Two Ländler, D 980B
| data-sort-value="key E-flat major" | E major
| data-sort-value="1828-11-19" | ?
| For piano
|-
| 680
| data-sort-value="980.3" | 980C
| data-sort-value="XXX,1930" | (1930)
| data-sort-value="ZZZZ" |
| data-sort-value="726,00" | VII/2, 6
| data-sort-value="Landler, 02, D 980C" | Two Ländler, D 980C
| data-sort-value="key D-flat major" | D major
| data-sort-value="1828-11-19" | ?
| For piano; Fragments
|-
| data-sort-value="999.09804" |
| data-sort-value="980.4" | 980D
| data-sort-value="XXX,1828" | (1828)
| data-sort-value="ZZZZ" |
| data-sort-value="727,a0" | VII/2, 7a
| Waltz, D 980D, a.k.a. Krähwinkler Tanz
| data-sort-value="key C major" | C major
| data-sort-value="1828-01-25" | before26/1/1828
| For piano
|-
| data-sort-value="999.09805" |
| data-sort-value="980.5" | 980E
| data-sort-value="ZZZZ" |
| data-sort-value="ZZZZ" |
| data-sort-value="726,00" | VII/2, 6
| data-sort-value="Dances, 02, D 980E" | Two Dances, D 980E
| data-sort-value="key I" | Various keys
| data-sort-value="1818-01-01" | 1818 orlater
| For piano(?); Sketches
|-
| data-sort-value="999.09806" |
| data-sort-value="980.6" | 980F
| data-sort-value="ZZZZ" |
| data-sort-value="ZZZZ" |
| data-sort-value="726,00" | VII/2, 6
| March, D 980F
| data-sort-value="key G major" | G major
| data-sort-value="1828-11-19" | ?
| For piano; Arr. of a lost march for orchestra?
|-
| 981
| 981
| data-sort-value="ZZZZ" |
| data-sort-value="ZZZZ" |
| data-sort-value="ZZZZ" |
| data-sort-value="Minnesanger, Der" | Der Minnesänger
| data-sort-value="theatre (Singspiel)" | (Singspiel)
| data-sort-value="1828-11-19" | ?
| data-sort-value="Text by Kotzebue, August von? Minnesanger, Der" | Text by Kotzebue?; Lost
|-
| 982
| 982
| data-sort-value="ZZZZ" |
| data-sort-value="ZZZZ" |
| data-sort-value="216,00" | II, 16
| Sketches for an opera a.k.a. Sophie
| data-sort-value="theatre (Opera)" | (Opera)
| data-sort-value="1820-10-01" | Sep.–Oct.1820
| For satb and orchestra; Nos. 1–3 (No. 3 partly reused in  No. 7)
|-
| data-sort-value="983.01" | 983No.1
| 983
| data-sort-value="017,1823-1" | 17,1(1823)
| data-sort-value="1600,020" | XVINo. 20
| data-sort-value="304,48" | III, 4No. 48
| data-sort-value="Junglingswonne" | Jünglingswonne
| data-sort-value="text So lang im deutschen Eichentale" | So lang im deutschen Eichentale
| data-sort-value="1823-10-08" | before9/10/1823
| data-sort-value="Text by Matthisson, Friedrich von, So lang im deutschen Eichentale" | Text by Matthisson; For ttbb
|-
| data-sort-value="983.02" | 983No.2
| data-sort-value="983.1" | 983A
| data-sort-value="017,1823-2" | 17,2(1823)
| data-sort-value="1600,021" | XVINo. 21
| data-sort-value="304,49" | III, 4No. 49
| Liebe
| data-sort-value="text Liebe rauscht der Silberbach" | Liebe rauscht der Silberbach
| data-sort-value="1823-10-08" | before9/10/1823
|data-sort-value="Text by Schiller, Friedrich from Triumph der Liebe, Der 25 6" | Text by Schiller, from "Der Triumph der Liebe": stanza 25; Other: , 61, 62, 63, 64; For ttbb
|-
| data-sort-value="983.03" | 983No.3
| data-sort-value="983.2" | 983B
| data-sort-value="017,1823-3" | 17,3(1823)
| data-sort-value="1600,022" | XVINo. 22
| data-sort-value="304,50" | III, 4No. 50
| Zum Rundetanz
| data-sort-value="text Auf! es dunkelt; silbern funkelt 1" | Auf! es dunkelt; silbern funkelt
| data-sort-value="1823-10-08" | before9/10/1823
| data-sort-value="Text by Salis-Seewis, Johann Gaudenz von, Auf! es dunkelt; silbern funkelt 1" | Text by Salis-Seewis; For ttbb
|-
| data-sort-value="983.04" | 983No.4
| data-sort-value="983.3" | 983C
| data-sort-value="017,1823-4" | 17,4(1823)
| data-sort-value="1600,023" | XVINo. 23
| data-sort-value="304,51" | III, 4No. 51
| data-sort-value="Nacht, Die, D 983C" | Die Nacht, D 983C
| data-sort-value="text Wie schon bist du, freundliche Stille" | Wie schön bist du, freundliche Stille
| data-sort-value="1823-10-08" | before9/10/1823
| data-sort-value="Text by Krummacher, Friedrich Wilhelm, Wie schon bist du, freundliche Stille" | Text by Krummacher(?); For ttbb
|-
| 984
| 984
| data-sort-value="169,1865-0" | 169p(1865)
| data-sort-value="ZZZZ" |
| data-sort-value="303,77" | III, 3 Anh. II No. 7
| data-sort-value="Wintertag, Der" | Der Wintertag a.k.a. Geburtstaglied
| data-sort-value="text In schoner heller Winterzeit" | In schöner heller Winterzeit
| data-sort-value="1821-01-01" | 1821 orlater?
| For ttbb and piano; Fragment: piano part lost
|-
| 985
| 985
| data-sort-value="112,1829-1" | 112p,1(1829)
| data-sort-value="1700,006" | XVIINo. 6
| data-sort-value="302,04" | III, 2aNo. 4
| Gott im Ungewitter
| data-sort-value="text Du Schrecklicher, wer kann vor dir und deinem Donner stehn?" | Du Schrecklicher, wer kann vor dir und deinem Donner stehn?
| data-sort-value="1828-11-19" | ?
| data-sort-value="Text by Uz, Johann, Du Schrecklicher, wer kann vor dir und deinem Donner stehn?" | Text by Uz; For satb and piano
|-
| 986
| 986
| data-sort-value="112,1829-2" | 112p,2(1829)
| data-sort-value="1700,007" | XVIINo. 7
| data-sort-value="302,05" | III, 2aNo. 5
| data-sort-value="Gott der Weltschopfer" | Gott der Weltschöpfer
| data-sort-value="text Zu Gott, zu Gott flieg auf" | Zu Gott, zu Gott flieg auf
| data-sort-value="1828-11-19" | ?
| data-sort-value="Text by Uz, Johann, Zu Gott, zu Gott flieg auf" | Text by Uz; For satb and piano
|-
| 988
| 988
| data-sort-value="XXX,1873" | (1873)
| data-sort-value="1900,026" | XIXNo. 26
| data-sort-value="304,61" | III, 4No. 61VIII, 2No. 30
| data-sort-value="Liebe sauseln die Blätter" | Liebe säuseln die Blätter
| data-sort-value="text Liebe sauseln die Blatter" | Liebe säuseln die Blätter
| data-sort-value="1828-11-19" | ?
| data-sort-value="Text by Holty, Ludwig Heinrich Christoph, Liebe sauseln die Blatter" | Text by Hölty; Canon for three voices
|-
| data-sort-value="999.09881" |
| data-sort-value="988.1" | 988A
| data-sort-value="ZZZZ" |
| data-sort-value="ZZZZ" |
| data-sort-value="303,78" | III, 3 Anh. II No. 8
| Accompaniment part
| data-sort-value="key B-flat major" | B major
| data-sort-value="1821-01-01" | 1821 orlater
| For piano, as accompaniment for a vocal composition
|-
| rowspan="2" | 990
| 990
| data-sort-value="XXX,1853" | (1853)
| data-sort-value="ZZZZ" |
| data-sort-value="414,00" | IV, 14
| data-sort-value="Graf von Habsburg, Der" | Der Graf von Habsburg
| data-sort-value="text Zu Aachen in seiner Kaiserpracht" | Zu Aachen in seiner Kaiserpracht
| data-sort-value="1815-01-01" | 1815–1820
| data-sort-value="Text by Schiller, Friedrich, Zu Aachen in seiner Kaiserpracht" | Text by Schiller
|-
| data-sort-value="990.1" | 990A
| data-sort-value="XXX,1853" | (1853)
| data-sort-value="ZZZZ" |
| data-sort-value="414,00" | IV, 14
| Kaiser Maximilian auf der Martinswand [in Tirol]
| data-sort-value="text Hinauf! hinauf! in Sprung und Lauf" | Hinauf! hinauf! in Sprung und Lauf
| data-sort-value="1815-01-01" | 1815–1820
| data-sort-value="Text by Collin, Heinrich Joseph von, Hinauf! hinauf! in Sprung und Lauf" | Text by Collin, H. J.
|-
| 582
| data-sort-value="990.2" | 990B
| data-sort-value="ZZZZ" |
| data-sort-value="ZZZZ" |
| data-sort-value="414,00" | IV, 14
| Augenblicke im Elysium
| data-sort-value="text Vor der in Ehrfurcht all mein Wesen kniet" | Vor der in Ehrfurcht all mein Wesen kniet
| data-sort-value="1828-11-19" | ?
| data-sort-value="Text by Schober, Franz von, Vor der in Ehrfurcht all mein Wesen kniet" | Text by Schober; Music lost
|-
| 868
| data-sort-value="990.3" | 990C
| data-sort-value="130,1830-0" | 130p(1830)
| data-sort-value="2008,513" | XX, 8No. 513
| data-sort-value="414,00" | IV, 14
| data-sort-value="Echo, Das" | Das Echo
| data-sort-value="text Herzliebe gute Mutter, o grolle nicht mit mir" | Herzliebe gute Mutter, o grolle nicht mit mir
| data-sort-value="1828-11-19" | ?
| data-sort-value="Text by Castelli, Ignaz Franz, Herzliebe gute Mutter, o grolle nicht mit mir" | Text by Castelli
|-
| data-sort-value="999.09904" |
| data-sort-value="990.4" | 990D
| data-sort-value="ZZZZ" |
| data-sort-value="ZZZZ" |
| data-sort-value="414,00" | IV, 14
| data-sort-value="Schiffende, Die" | Die Schiffende
| data-sort-value="text Sie wankt dahin! Die Abendwinde spielen" | Sie wankt dahin! Die Abendwinde spielen
| data-sort-value="1828-11-19" | ?
| data-sort-value="Text by Holty, Ludwig Heinrich Christoph, Sie wankt dahin! Die Abendwinde spielen" | Text by Hölty; Music lost
|-
| data-sort-value="999.09905" |
| data-sort-value="990.5" | 990E
| data-sort-value="ZZZZ" |
| data-sort-value="ZZZZ" |
| data-sort-value="404,00" | IV, 4 IV, 11
| data-sort-value="Incanto degli occhi, L'" | L'incanto degli occhi
| data-sort-value="text Da voi, cari lumi 1" | Da voi, cari lumi
| data-sort-value="1813-01-01" | 1813–1816?
| Text by Metastasio, from Attilio Regolo II (other version:  No. 1); Aria for s
|-
| data-sort-value="999.09906" |
| data-sort-value="990.6" | 990F
| data-sort-value="ZZZZ" |
| data-sort-value="ZZZZ" |
| data-sort-value="411,00" | IV, 11
| Ombre amene a.k.a. La serenata
| data-sort-value="text Ombre amene" | Ombre amene
| data-sort-value="1813-01-01" | 1813–1816?
| Text by Metastasio; Aria for s; Formerly misidentified as an early setting of Il traditor deluso,  No. 2
|-
| 991
| data-sort-value="999.0323" | 323
| data-sort-value="ZZZZ" |

| data-sort-value="ZZZZ" |

| data-sort-value="ZZZZ" |

| data-sort-value="O so lasst euch froh begrussen" | O so laßt euch froh begrüssen
| data-sort-value="text O so lasst euch froh begrussen" | O so laßt euch froh begrüssen
| data-sort-value="ZZZZ" |

| data-sort-value="Text by Schiller, Friedrich, O so lasst euch froh begrussen" | Text by Schiller; Last part of 
|-
| 992
| data-sort-value="999.0383" | 383
| data-sort-value="ZZZZ" |

| data-sort-value="ZZZZ" |

| data-sort-value="ZZZZ" |

| data-sort-value="ZZZZ" |

| data-sort-value="ZZZZ" |

| data-sort-value="ZZZZ" |

| See 
|}

Lists of compositions by Franz Schubert
Compositions by Franz Schubert